Najmabad or Najamabad may refer to:
 Najmabad, Alborz
 Najamabad, Pasargad, Fars Province
 Najmabad, Qir and Karzin, Fars Province
 Najmabad, Shiraz, Fars Province
 Najmabad, Gilan
 Najmabad, Kerman
 Najmabad, Razmavaran, Kerman Province
 Najmabad, Markazi
 Najmabad, Qazvin
 Najmabad, Jafarabad, Qom Province
 Najmabad, Chenaran, Razavi Khorasan Province
 Najmabad, Gonabad, Razavi Khorasan Province
 Najmabad, Sabzevar, Razavi Khorasan Province
 Najmabad, Tehran
 Najmabad Rural District, in Alborz Province